The 2021 Campbell Fighting Camels football team represented the Campbell University as a member of the Big South Conference during the 2021 NCAA Division I FCS football season. Led by ninth-year head coach Mike Minter, the Fighting Camels played their home games at the Barker–Lane Stadium in Buies Creek, North Carolina.

Schedule

References

Campbell
Campbell Fighting Camels football seasons
Campbell Fighting Camels football